Caccior is a town in Graubünden, Switzerland.

Villages in Graubünden